The Symphony in E-flat, Op. 1, is the first published work composed by Igor Stravinsky during his apprenticeship with Nikolai Rimsky-Korsakov. It is also his first composition for orchestra. Of classical structure, it is broadly influenced by Rimsky-Korsakov, Glazunov, Tchaikovsky and Wagner. It was composed in 1905–1907 and revised in 1913. It lasts for about forty minutes.

History 
The score bears the dedication "To my dear teacher N. A. Rimsky-Korsakov". A private performance was given on 27 April 1907 by the St. Petersburg Court Orchestra conducted by H. Wahrlich, in a concert that also included the first performance of Faun and Shepherdess. Stravinsky later recalled that both Rimsky-Korsakov and Glazunov considered the orchestration "too heavy". The first public performance was conducted by Felix Blumenfeld on 22 January 1908. A revised version was conducted by Ernest Ansermet on 2 April 1914, and the composer conducted this version in his later performances.

Instrumentation
The symphony is scored for 3 flutes (3rd doubling piccolo), 2 oboes, 3 clarinets, 2 bassoons, 4 horns, 3 trumpets, 3 trombones, tuba, timpani, percussion and strings.

Movements

Allegro moderato 
The first movement is in sonata form.

Scherzo 
This movement was sometimes played alone at performances of the Ballets Russes. Stravinsky incorporated into it a Russian folk song similar to one he used in Petrushka.

Largo 
The longest movement of the symphony, lasting almost fifteen minutes.

Finale 
The finale is a rondo. As in the second movement, Stravinsky includes a popular song ("Tchitcher-Yatcher"). He used it again in his Trois petites chansons of 1913.

Discography 
 Stravinsky's recording of this symphony in his collected works on Sony Classical was recorded by the Columbia Symphony Orchestra in May 1966.

References 

Symphonies by Igor Stravinsky
Stravinsky
1907 compositions
Compositions in E-flat major